Biakoye District is one of the eight districts in Oti Region, Ghana. Originally it was formerly part of the then-larger Jasikan District on 10 March 1989, which was created from the former Jasikan District Council, until the western part of the district was split off to create Biakoye District on 29 February 2008, which was established by Legislative Instrument (L.I.) 1910; thus the remaining part has been retained as Jasikan District. The district assembly is located in the southern part of Oti Region and has Nkonya Ahenkro as its capital town.

Towns

 Bowiri Anyinase
 Aboabo
Akposokubi
Akposo Kabo
Akposo Oklabe
Akposo Alifi
Akposo Ɔbɛvɛ (Asukawkaw)
 Tapa Abotoase
 Tapa Amanya
 Tapa Amanfrom
 Dedekrom
 Oyiran
 Bowiri Amanfrom
 Bowiri Kyirahin
 Takrabe
 Aboabo Abohire
 Takrabe
 Anlokodzi
 Bongo
 Odumase
 Bowiri Kofzi
 Bowiri New-Kwamekrom
 Nkonya Tepo
 Nkonya Ntumda
 Nkonya Kadjebi
 Nikonya Tayi
 Nkonya Ntsumuru
 Nkonya Ahenkro
 Nkonya Akloba
 Asakyiri
 Ahundwo
 Nkonya Bumbulla Adenkesu
 Nkonya
 Wurupong
 Awerekyekye
 Gyamerakrom
 Osoroasuom
 Kotomase
 Worawora

Notable people 
A notable citizen of the District is Ave K. Kludze, a NASA rocket scientist who was honoured at the village of Gbi Kpeme, near Nkonya Ahenkro, during a festival.

References

External links 
 
 Biakoye District at GhanaDistricts.com

Districts of the Oti Region
States and territories established in 2008